Plenty of Horn is the debut album by American trumpeter Ted Curson which was first released on the Old Town label in 1961.

Reception

Allmusic awarded the album 4 stars.

Track listing
All compositions by Ted Curson except as indicated
 "Caravan" (Duke Ellington, Irving Mills, Juan Tizol) - 2:59
 "Nosruc" - 6:23
 "The Things We Did Last Summer" (Sammy Cahn, Jule Styne) - 4:29
 "Dem's Blues" - 3:45
 "Ahma (See Ya)" - 4:24
 "Flatted Fifth" - 3:37
 "Bali Ha'i" (Oscar Hammerstein II, Richard Rodgers) - 4:00
 "Antibes" - 5:07
 "Mr. Teddy" - 5:15

Personnel
Ted Curson - trumpet
Eric Dolphy - flute (tracks 3 & 7)
Bill Barron - tenor saxophone (tracks 1, 2, 4–6, 8 & 9)
Kenny Drew - piano
Jimmy Garrison - bass
Pete La Roca (tracks 1, 2, 4, 8 & 9), Dannie Richmond (tracks 3 & 7), Roy Haynes (tracks 5 & 6) - drums

References

1961 debut albums
Ted Curson albums